The Vermont Republican Party is the affiliate of the Republican Party in Vermont and has been active since its foundation in the 1860s. The party is the second largest in the state behind the Vermont Democratic Party, but ahead of the Vermont Progressive Party. The party historically dominated Vermont politics until the mid-20th century, but was replaced by the Vermont Democratic Party. The party currently has very weak electoral power in the state, controlling none of Vermont's federal elected offices. The only statewide office that the party controls is the governorship, currently held by Phil Scott.

History
The first convention of the Vermont Republican Party was held on July 13, 1854, in Montpelier, Vermont. The party was organized, nominated candidates for office, selected delegates to the Republican National Convention, and approved a platform. Lawrence Brainerd was selected to serve as president of the convention.

Eliakim Persons Walton was initially selected to serve as the party's gubernatorial nominee in the 1854 election, but he withdrew and the party selected to give its nomination to Stephen Royce, who was a member of the Whig Party and had already been nominated to serve as their gubernatorial candidate. Royce accepted the party's nomination and won the 1854 gubernatorial election. The Whig Party of Vermont disbanded and merged with the Republicans in 1854, and Joyce won reelected in the 1855 gubernatorial election with the Republican nomination.

The party won every statewide election from 1854 to 1958, won every presidential election from 1856 to 1960, and held the governorship from 1854 to 1963.

William H. Meyer won election to the United States House of Representatives from Vermont's at-large congressional district in 1958, becoming the first Democrat to win statewide since 1853. Senator Barry Goldwater, the Republican presidential nominee for the 1964 presidential election, became the first Republican to not win Vermont in a presidential election as he lost the state to incumbent Democratic President Lyndon B. Johnson. Philip H. Hoff's victory in the 1962 gubernatorial election made him the first member of the Democratic Party to hold Vermont's governorship since the 1853 gubernatorial election.

Vermont only elected Republicans to the United States Senate for 118 years. Patrick Leahy's victory in the 1974 Senate election made him the first member of the Democratic Party elected to the United States Senate from Vermont. Senator Jim Jeffords left the Republican Party on May 24, 2001, to become an independent and caucus with the Democratic Party which gave them the majority in the United States Senate.

The party controlled all of the seats in the Vermont Senate after the 1924 election. The Democrats gained control of the state senate for the first time after the 1986 election. The party received its lowest amount of seats in the state senate since its foundation in the 2018 election.

Current elected officials
The Vermont Republican Party controls one of the six statewide offices.

Members of Congress
 None

Statewide offices

Legislative
 Vermont Senate
 Minority Leader: Randy Brock
 Vermont House of Representatives
 Minority Leader: Patricia McCoy

Municipal
 David Allaire (Rutland Mayor)

References

External links
 Vermont Republican Party

1860s establishments in Vermont
Political parties established in the 1860s
Republican Party
Vermont